Outrage is a 1950 black-and-white B-movie starring Mala Powers. It was directed by Ida Lupino. Lupino also co-wrote the script, along with the producers Malvin Wald and Lupino's then-husband Collier Young.

Outrage, the first starring film role for Powers, was both controversial and remarkable for being only the second post-Code Hollywood film to deal with the issue of rape, after Johnny Belinda (1948).

In 2020, the film was selected for preservation in the National Film Registry by the Library of Congress as being "culturally historically or aesthetically significant".

Plot
Ann Walton (Mala Powers) is a young bookkeeper who has a steady boyfriend, Jim Owens. When Jim announces that he has received a raise, the young couple decide to finally marry and inform Ann's parents about the engagement. Meanwhile, a man who works at the concession stand where Ann works takes an interest in her and tries to flirt with her, though she is uninterested.

Staying late at work one night, Ann notices she is being stalked and tries to run away from the man who is following her. She is unable to hide and is eventually caught and raped by the man who works the concession stand. The memory of a scar on the man's neck is the only thing able to come through to Ann in her trauma.

Returning home, Ann's parents learn of what happened and contact the police. Though the police and her family, friends, and fiancé, Jim, are supportive, Ann believes that the neighbors are gossiping about her and that Jim can no longer see her as she once was. After being forced to look at a lineup of men with scars, none of whom she can identify as her attacker, Ann runs away, taking the bus to Los Angeles on a whim.

While the bus driver is on a break, Ann overhears on the radio that her parents are looking for her and have identified her as the victim of a rape. Ann runs away from the bus and sprains her ankle where she is found by a man named Rev. Bruce Ferguson. He brings Ann to the orange farm belonging to his friends, the Harrisons. He does his best to help Ann out, eventually securing her a job as a bookkeeper for the Harrisons. Ann and Ferguson grow increasingly close. When Ferguson asks her to attend a local festival she agrees, but when another attendee pressures her for a kiss she is reminded of her rape, and attacks him with a wrench.

Ann is forced to stand trial, but Ferguson investigates why she would do such a thing and learns of her rape. He is able to persuade the judge to commute her sentence, and instead she sees a psychiatrist for a year. 

After the psychiatric treatment has concluded, Ann wants to stay with Ferguson and pursue a relationship with him, but he tells her not to run from life's challenges and encourages her to return to her old life and to Jim.

Cast
 Mala Powers as Ann Walton
 Tod Andrews as Rev. Bruce Ferguson
 Robert Clarke as Jim Owens
 Raymond Bond as Eric Walton
 Lilian Hamilton as Mrs. Walton
 Rita Lupino as Stella Carter
 Hal March as Det. Sgt. Hendrix 
 Kenneth Patterson as Tom Harrison
 Jerry Paris as Frank Marini
 Angela Clarke as Madge Harrison
 Roy Engel as Sheriff Charlie Hanlon
 Lovyss Bradley as Mrs. Miller
 Robin Camp as Shoeshine Boy
 William Challee as Lee Wilkins
 Tristram Coffin as Judge McKenzie

Critical reception
Modern critics have given it mixed reviews. It holds a 61% approval rating on Rotten Tomatoes, based on 23 reviews.

Fred Camper from Chicago Reader in a positive review wrote "may not be stylistically original or completely successful, but it does treat the subject of rape with real sensitivity, especially for its era."

Richard Brody of The New Yorker in his review he glowingly lauded the film and Lupino's direction saying, Lupino turns prudish Hollywood conventions into a crucial part of the story: just as the word “rape” is never spoken in the movie, Ann is prevented from talking about her experience, and, spurred by the torment of her enforced silence and the trauma that shatters her sense of identity, she runs away from home. Lupino’s drama blends Ann’s story with an incisive view of the many societal failures that contribute to the crime—including the unwillingness of the legal system to face the prevalence of rape. Above all, Lupino depicts a culture of leers and wolf whistles and domineering boyfriends, and reveals the widespread and unquestioned aggression that women face in ostensibly consensual courtship and that’s ultimately inseparable from the violence that Ann endures.

References

External links 
 

1950 films
1950 drama films
American black-and-white films
American drama films
Film noir
Films directed by Ida Lupino
Films set in California
Films about rape
Films scored by Paul Sawtell
United States National Film Registry films
1950s English-language films
1950s American films